The 2016 Red Bull Air Race of Budapest was the fourth round of the 2016 Red Bull Air Race World Championship season, the eleventh season of the Red Bull Air Race World Championship. The event was held on the Danube in Budapest, Hungary. Much of the event was cancelled due to heavy rain.

Master Class

Qualification
Qualifying was cancelled due to inclement weather. Round of 14 fixtures were decided by championship standings.

Round of 14

 Pilot received 2 seconds in penalties

 Pilot received 4 seconds in penalties

Round of 8

 Pilot received 2 seconds in penalties

 Pilot received 4 seconds in penalties

Final 4

The Final 4 round was not held due to inclement weather. The final results were determined by the times set in the Round of 8, meaning Matthias Dolderer was the event winner. 75% of usual points were awarded in this situation.

Challenger Class
Due to inclement weather on race day the Challenger Class race was cancelled.

Standings after the event

Master Class standings

 Note: Only the top five positions are included.

References

External links

|- style="text-align:center"
|width="35%"|Previous race:2016 Red Bull Air Race of Chiba
|width="30%"|Red Bull Air Race2016 season
|width="35%"|Next race:2016 Red Bull Air Race of Ascot
|- style="text-align:center"
|width="35%"|Previous race:2015 Red Bull Air Race of Budapest
|width="30%"|Red Bull Air Race of Budapest
|width="35%"|Next race:2017 Red Bull Air Race of Budapest
|- style="text-align:center"

Budapest
Red Bull Air Race World Championship
Red Bull Air Race World Championship